Kilsfjord may refer to two locations in Norway:

Kilsfjord, Telemark, a fjord in Kragerø, Telemark county
Kilsfjord, Møre og Romsdal, a fjord in Volda, Møre og Romsdal county